Andrej Jakimovski (born 18 March 2001) is a Macedonian college basketball player for the Washington State Cougars of the Pac-12 Conference.

Early career

Jakimovski played for Basket Torino of the Italian Serie A2 Basket during the 2019–20 season. He saw little playing time for Torino. In the Italian NextGen Under-19 competition, he averaged 28 points, 14 rebounds, 4.3 assists and 3 steals per game.

On 21 June 2020, Jakimovski committed to playing college basketball for the Washington State Cougars. He had several offers from European professional teams but decided to come to America to play collegiately. According to Washington State coach Kyle Smith, the Cougars had been recruiting him for over a year. Jakimovski was also recruited by Utah, Georgia Tech, Boston College, Minnesota, Utah State and Davidson. He was regarded as a four-star prospect by 247Sports and is Washington State's fourth-highest rated recruit after Klay Thompson, Mouhamed Gueye, and Michael Harthun.

College career
As a freshman, Jakimovski averaged 5.5 points, 4.1 rebounds, and 1.8 assists per game. After the season, he announced he was entering the transfer portal. Jakimovski initially committed to Loyola (Maryland), but ultimately opted to return to Washington State.

National team career
Jakimovski made three appearances for the Macedonian junior national teams at the FIBA U16 and U18 European Championships. He led the FIBA U18 European Championship B in scoring with 18.4 points per game to go with 9.4 rebounds per game, leading the team to a fourth-place finish. In February 2020, Jakimovski made his debut for the senior national team during the FIBA European qualifying tournament.

Career statistics

College

|-
| style="text-align:left;"| 2020–21
| style="text-align:left;"| Washington State
| 25 || 19 || 25.2 || .313 || .320 || .600 || 4.1 || 1.8 || .3 || .2 || 5.5

References

External links
Washington State Cougars bio
FIBA profile

2001 births
Living people
Sportspeople from Skopje
Macedonian men's basketball players
Washington State Cougars men's basketball players
Small forwards
Basket Torino players